Foshan Shadi Airport , or Shadi Air Base, is a dual-use military and public airport serving the city of Foshan in Guangdong Province, China. FUO was re-opened to serve as a relief airport for the region. Along with two other major airports, Guangzhou Baiyun International Airport and Shenzhen Bao'an International Airport, it serves the catchment area of the Pearl River Delta Economic Zone.

History
Built in 1954, Shadi Air Base is an airbase of People's Liberation Army Air Force. A squadron of J8-2 fighters are in support of the PLA Hong Kong Garrison.

Commercial flights started in 1985, but ceased in 2002 due to government policy.  The airport was reopened to the public in 2009.

It is planned to be replaced by the new Pearl River Delta International Airport in Genghe town, Gaoming District.

Airlines and destinations

See also

Pearl River Delta International Airport, a planned airport in Genghe town, Gaoming District, Foshan
List of airports in China
List of the busiest airports in China
List of People's Liberation Army Air Force airbases

References

Airports in Guangdong
Buildings and structures in Foshan
Chinese Air Force bases
Airports established in 1954
Airports established in 1985